Santa Cruz Xitla is a town and municipality in Oaxaca in south-western Mexico. The municipality covers an area of  km2. 
It is part of the Miahuatlán District in the south of the Sierra Sur Region.

As of 2005, the municipality had a total population of 3933.

Municipal president Pedro Modesto Santos died of COVID-19 in September 2020. He was the eighth municipal president in Oaxaca to die of the virus.

References

Municipalities of Oaxaca